Rucker is an unincorporated community located in Comanche County, in the U.S. state of Texas.

History
The community was named for Calvin Rucker, who established a gin there in 1890. The first mail carrier was Ira Harvey, while the first postmaster was Bob Lewis. The community's population was 25 in 1940. A filling station named Lightfoot that opened in 1930 was the only business in Rucker in 1976. It continued to be listed on county maps in 1990.

Geography

Education
Rucker had its own school at one time and sat on land donated by a man named Pat Johnson. Today, the community is served by the Gorman Independent School District.

References

Unincorporated communities in Comanche County, Texas
Unincorporated communities in Texas